Spiranthes longilabris, the long lipped ladies' tresses is an orchid endemic to the southeastern United States.

Description

Spiranthes longilabris plants are 15–50 cm tall, with 3-5 basal leaves either present or absent when flowering. There are 10-30 flowers arranged in a spiral around the stem, with a white to cream white color. The inside of the lip is yellow. Compared to other spiranthes species it has a long lip and the two lateral sepals are spreading to the outside. Bloom time is October to December.

Distribution and habitat

Spiranthes longilabris can be found in Alabama, Florida, Georgia, Louisiana, Mississippi, North Carolina, South Carolina, Texas, Virginia.

It grows in the coastal plain with a maximum elevation of 50 m, in dry and moist grassland as well as woodland.

Taxonomy
Spiranthes longilabris was first described by John Lindley in 1840.

References

longilabris
Orchids of the United States